Scopula phallarcuata is a moth of the family Geometridae. It is found on Borneo. The habitat consists of lowland forests and lower montane forests on limestone. It has also been recorded from various softwood plantations in the lowlands of Sabah.

References

Moths described in 1997
phallarcuata
Moths of Asia